Pilot Field may refer to:

Pilot Field (LSUS), a baseball stadium at Louisiana State University Shreveport
The former name for Sahlen Field, a baseball stadium in Buffalo, New York 
The former name for Joe Etzel Field, a college baseball stadium in Portland, Oregon 
 The Pilot Field, an association football stadium in Hastings, East Sussex, England